David E. Clarke (born 31 December 1952) is a former Australian rules footballer with the Geelong Football Club. Better known as a half-forward flanker he also played in the centre and centre half-back. He won the club Best and Fairest three times and was runner-up four times.

Clarke was a director of the failed Geelong based Pyramid Building Society, which collapsed in 1990 with debts of A$2 billion.  He was charged with 13 breaches of the Building Societies Act and was given a two-year suspended jail sentence and fined $47,000 after pleading guilty.

References

External links

Notable relatives
David Clarke (son) – ex-Geelong and Carlton player.
Tim Clarke (son) – ex-Hawthorn player
Georgina Clarke (daughter) – Middle-distance runner, competed at the 2000 Summer Olympics in Sydney as a 16-year-old, semi-finalist in the Women's 1500m.

1952 births
Carji Greeves Medal winners
Geelong Football Club players
Carlton Football Club players
Living people
All-Australians (1953–1988)
Australian rules footballers from Victoria (Australia)
People educated at Geelong College